"Holiday" is a song released by the Bee Gees in the United States in September 1967. It appeared on the album Bee Gees' 1st. The song was not released as a single in their native United Kingdom because Polydor UK released the single "World" from their next album Horizontal.

Composition and recording
The song is composed primarily in a minor key with a strong orchestral presence. Brothers Barry and Robin Gibb, who also wrote the song, share lead vocals. The song was recorded during the same session as "To Love Somebody" around April 1967.

All three Gibb brothers sung the "Dee dees" in the chorus sections of the song.

Release
Billboard described the single as "an intriguing ballad change of pace from their "To Love Somebody" hit," and specifically praised the production.  Cash Box praised the "powerful organ backdrop" and "excellent vocal showing."

The song's flipside was "Every Christian Lion Hearted Man Will Show You" in the US, Canada and Australia but "Red Chair, Fade Away" was used in other territories. The song's music video, consisted of footage of the band enjoying traveling a city bus in Paris. Their footage visiting Paris is also used as the music video for "Words". Another promotional film, filmed in black and white, featured the group performing the song.

The song remained a concert favourite for over 30 years, and Maurice Gibb often provided the audience with comedic antics by attempting many failed attempts to join Barry and Robin while singing this song. Evidence of this can be seen in the 1989 "One For All" concert video where Maurice takes a camera from a film cameraman standing nearby and films Barry and Robin as they sing the song.

Personnel
 Barry Gibb – lead and backing vocals
 Robin Gibb – lead and backing vocals, pump organ
 Maurice Gibb – bass guitar, mellotron, Hammond organ, backing vocals
 Colin Petersen – drums
 Bill Shepherd —–orchestral arrangement

Chart performance

Weekly charts

Year-end charts

Cover versions
 In 1968 French-American singer Claudine Longet covered the song on the album Love Is Blue, A&M Records – SP-4142, Side A Track 4.
 In 1968 French singer Michel Didier covered the song in French under the title C'est une folle idée (lyrics: Michel Didier).
 In 1979, Moulin Rouge recorded a late 1970s disco style cover version 
 In 2007, HRSTA recorded a cover on its third album Ghosts Will Come and Kiss Our Eyes

Legacy
The song was prominently featured in the South Korean film Nowhere to Hide(). It later featured in the South Korean television series Reply 1997, and South Korean girl group Red Velvet's Level Up Project, as a contrast to the song of the same name by SM Entertainment labelmate, Girl's Generation.

One of the robots sang the song in the "Mitchell" episode of the American television comedy series Mystery Science Theater 3000.

References

1967 singles
1967 songs
Bee Gees songs
Demis Roussos songs
Songs written by Barry Gibb
Songs written by Robin Gibb
Song recordings produced by Robert Stigwood
Polydor Records singles
Atco Records singles